Senator Blaine may refer to:

James G. Blaine (1830–1893), U.S. Senator from Maine from 1876 to 1881
John J. Blaine (1875–1934), U.S. Senator from Wisconsin from 1927 to 1933